

Sigehelm was a medieval Bishop of Sherborne.

Sigehelm was consecrated either around 909 or between 918 and 925. He died between 932 and 934.

Notes

Citations

References

External links
 

Bishops of Sherborne (ancient)
930s deaths
10th-century English bishops
Year of birth unknown